Hephaestion is a genus of beetles in the family Cerambycidae.

Containing the following species:

 Hephaestion annulatum Philippi, 1859
 Hephaestion auratum Cerda, 1968
 Hephaestion bullocki Cerda, 1968
 Hephaestion chalybeum Philippi, 1865
 Hephaestion corralensis Philippi & Philippi, 1864
 Hephaestion cyanopterum Philippi & Philippi, 1864
 Hephaestion flavicornis Philippi & Philippi, 1864
 Hephaestion fuscescens Philippi & Philippi, 1864
 Hephaestion holomelas Philippi & Philippi, 1864
 Hephaestion lariosi Bosq, 1951
 Hephaestion nigricornis Fairmaire & Germain, 1861
 Hephaestion ocreatum Newman, 1840
 Hephaestion pallidicornis Fairmaire & Germain, 1859
 Hephaestion tolhuaca Cerda, 1995
 Hephaestion versicolor Philippi, 1859
 Hephaestion violaceipennis Fairmaire & Germain, 1861

References

Necydalinae
Cerambycidae genera